The Cowboy Quarterback is a 1939 American comedy film directed by Noel M. Smith and written by Fred Niblo, Jr. The film stars Bert Wheeler, Marie Wilson, Gloria Dickson, William Demarest, Eddie Foy, Jr. and William Hopper. The film was released by Warner Bros. on July 29, 1939.

Plot

Rusty Walker, a scout for the Chicago Packers professional football team, discovers a young fellow named Harry Lynn in remote Montana who has amazing prowess as a quarterback. He persuades Harry to come to Chicago, but because Harry is afraid to leave girlfriend Maizie alone with rival suitor "Handsome Sam" Saxon, he insists that Maizie be permitted to come along.

Harry's play is as good as Rusty expects it to be, but Maizie is a constant distraction. When she leaves town, team management fixes up Harry with the attractive Evelyn Corey and, sure enough, he falls in love. Harry writes a letter to Maizie, breaking off their engagement, then has second thoughts, but teammate Steve mails it without Harry's knowledge.

Getting drunk, Harry loses $5,000 gambling while unaware he was betting real money. Crooks instruct him to throw the Packers' big game against the Ramblers, and things get further complicated when Harry learns that Evelyn actually intends to marry Rusty, not him. Maizie returns with Handsome Sam, and after leading the team to victory in the final seconds, Harry manages to intercept Handsome Sam as he is about to hand Maizie the unopened letter.

Cast 
Bert Wheeler as Harry Lynn
Marie Wilson as Maizie Williams
Gloria Dickson as Evelyn Corey
William Demarest as Rusty Walker
Eddie Foy, Jr. as Steve Adams
William Hopper as Handsome Sam Saxon 
William Gould as Colonel Moffett
Charles C. Wilson as Coach Hap Farrell
Frederic Tozere as Mr. Slater 
John Harron as Mr. Gray
John Ridgely as Mr. Walters
Eddie Acuff as Airplane Pilot
Clem Bevans as Lem

References

Sources

External links
 

1939 films
1930s English-language films
Warner Bros. films
American sports comedy films
1930s sports comedy films
Films directed by Noel M. Smith
American football films
American black-and-white films
1939 comedy films
1930s American films